DJT may refer to:
 Donald John Trump (born 1946), 45th president of the United States
 Donald John Trump Jr., politician and eldest son of Donald John Trump
 La Compagnie, or Dreamjet (ICAO airline code: DJT), a French airline
 DJT, the Central Directorate of the technical and scientific police in the Federal Police of Belgium
 "DJT", a 2013 song by Aubrey O'Day from her EP Between Two Evils
 DJT, a restaurant in the Trump International Hotel Las Vegas